Nicolae Kovács (sometimes rendered as Nicolae Covaci, 29 December 1911 – 7 July 1977) was a Romanian-Hungarian football player and coach. He was a dual international football player and played both for Romania and Hungary.

For the Romania national football team, he won 37 caps and participated in the 1930, 1934 and 1938 World Cups, being one of five players to have appeared in all three of the pre-war World Cups. The other players were Edmond Delfour, Étienne Mattler, Bernard Voorhoof and Rudolf Bürger, according to official FIFA match reports. Later, he also represented the Hungary national football team once.

He was the older brother of Ștefan Kovács, the famous coach who led AFC Ajax to two European Cups in 1972 and 1973.

International goals
Romania's goal tally first

Honours

Player
Ripensia Timișoara
Liga I (1): 1935–36
Cupa României (1): 1935–36

Coach
CA Oradea
Liga I (1): 1948–49
Politehnica Timișoara
Liga II (1): 1952

References and notes

External links

1911 births
1977 deaths
People from Caraș-Severin County
People from the Kingdom of Hungary
Romanian footballers
Romania international footballers
Romanian expatriate footballers
Romanian sportspeople of Hungarian descent
Hungary international footballers
Hungarian footballers
1930 FIFA World Cup players
1934 FIFA World Cup players
1938 FIFA World Cup players
Dual internationalists (football)
Liga I players
Chinezul Timișoara players
Banatul Timișoara players
FC Ripensia Timișoara players
Valenciennes FC players
CA Oradea players
FC Ploiești players
Crișana Oradea players
FC Universitatea Cluj managers
CS Gaz Metan Mediaș managers
CA Oradea managers
CSM Jiul Petroșani managers
Association football forwards
Romanian football managers
Expatriate footballers in France
Romanian expatriate sportspeople in France